Kentucky Route 3174 (KY 3174) is a  state highway in the U.S. state of Kentucky. The highway connects U.S. Route 23 in Yeager with Wolfpit, with extensions underway to the Virginia state line near Breaks. In the future, upon completion of the Virginia segment and the connection to U.S. Route 121, KY 3174 will be redesignated U.S. Route 460.

Major intersections

References

External links

3174
Transportation in Pike County, Kentucky